James Mathieson (29 November 1892 – 21 April 1982) was an Australian rules footballer who played with Geelong in the Victorian Football League (VFL).

Notes

External links 

1892 births
1982 deaths
Australian rules footballers from Victoria (Australia)
Geelong Football Club players
Cobden Football Club players